Pakenham railway station is the terminus of the suburban electrified Pakenham line in Victoria, Australia. It serves the south-eastern Melbourne suburb of Pakenham, and it opened on 8 October 1877.

The station is also serviced by V/Line services to Traralgon and Bairnsdale.

Stabling facilities were located directly south of the station, until their removal in 2022.

History

Pakenham station opened 8 October 1877, when the railway line from Dandenong was extended. Like the suburb itself, the station is named after Sir Edward Michael Pakenham, a Major General who served in the Peninsular War.

In 1938, flashing light signals were provided at the Main Street level crossing, located at the Up end of the station.

Initially single track, in 1954, the railway line between Pakenham and Nar Nar Goon was duplicated. In 1955, the line between Pakenham and Officer was duplicated and, in 1959, the current island platform was provided, when duplication occurred through the station.

In 1970, the station buildings were replaced with a new pebblestone structure, and on 19 January 1975, electrified suburban services were extended to the station. A crossover was also provided at the Up end of the station around this time. During 1979-1980, further upgrades to the station occurred.

On 16 April 1980, Pakenham was the scene of a collision between Hitachi carriage 353D and guards van 286ZL. The guards van was destroyed in the collision, and the Hitachi carriage was later scrapped.

In 1986, boom barriers were provided at the Main Street level crossing.

On 15 March 1997, Pakenham was upgraded to a Premium Station. Since 2001, it has been the extremity of the electrified network.

On March 9 2011, a Siemens train over-ran No. 5 road near the station, crashing into a stanchion.

In March 2014, it was announced that a new train servicing facility would be built at Pakenham East, to service the High Capacity Metro Trains.

The Main Street level crossing is scheduled to be grade separated by 2023-2024, as part of the Level Crossing Removal Project. A rail bridge will be built over the road, and will include a new, rebuilt station. As part of this project, two other crossings in Pakenham are scheduled to be removed, and the line extended approximately 2km to a new station at Pakenham East.

Platforms and services

Pakenham has one island platform with two faces. It is serviced by Metro Trains' Pakenham line services, and V/Line Traralgon and Bairnsdale line services. Suburban services generally use Platform 1, with westbound V/Line services often crossing to Platform 2 to pass any suburban service.

Platform 1:
  all stations and limited express services to Flinders Street
  V/Line services to Southern Cross

Platform 2:
  all stations and limited express services to Flinders Street
  V/Line services to Southern Cross, Traralgon and Bairnsdale

By late 2025, it is planned that trains on the Pakenham line will be through-routed with those on the Sunbury line, via the new Metro Tunnel.

Transport links

Ventura Bus Lines operates seven routes via Pakenham station, under contract to Public Transport Victoria:
 : Gembrook – Pakenham
 : to Lakeside (Pakenham)
 : to Westfield Fountain Gate
 : to Pakenham North (via The Avenue)
 : to Cardinia Road station
 : to Pakenham North (via Army Road and Windermere Boulevard)
 to Koo Wee Rup (unnumbered route and does not show on the relevant Public Transport Victoria local area map)

Warragul Bus Lines operates one route to and from Pakenham station, under contract to Public Transport Victoria:
 to Garfield station

Gallery

References

External links
 
 Melway map at street-directory.com.au

Premium Melbourne railway stations
Railway stations in Melbourne
Railway stations in Australia opened in 1877
Railway stations in the Shire of Cardinia